The canton of Villeneuve-Loubet is an administrative division of the Alpes-Maritimes department, southeastern France. It was created at the French canton reorganisation which came into effect in March 2015. Its seat is in Villeneuve-Loubet.

It consists of the following communes:
La Colle-sur-Loup 
Roquefort-les-Pins
Saint-Paul-de-Vence
Villeneuve-Loubet

References

Cantons of Alpes-Maritimes